William Nevill, 4th Earl of Abergavenny (28 June 1792 – 17 August 1868), styled Hon. William Nevill until 1845, was a British peer and clergyman. The fourth son of Henry Nevill, 2nd Earl of Abergavenny, he was ordained in 1816 and occupied two of the family livings until 1844. He succeeded his brother as Earl of Abergavenny the following year.

Career
Nevill was born on 28 June 1792, the fourth son of Henry Neville, 2nd Earl of Abergavenny, and his wife Mary Robinson. He was baptised on 2 August 1792 at Isleworth, Middlesex. Nevill was educated at Uckfield, matriculated at Christ Church, Oxford on 22 October 1812, and was admitted fellow-commoner at Magdalene College, Cambridge on 29 March 1816, receiving his MA the same year. He was ordained as a deacon on 21 July 1816. On 1 November 1816, he was appointed rector of the family living of Birling, Kent, and on 23 September 1818, to the vicarage of Frant, Sussex, which his elder brother John had vacated for him. He resigned his livings in 1844 and succeeded his unmarried elder brother, John, as Earl of Abergavenny in 1845.

Family
He married Caroline Leeke (d. 9 May 1873) on 7 September 1824, daughter of Ralph Leeke of Longford Hall, Shropshire, and they had the following children:
William Nevill, 1st Marquess of Abergavenny (1826–1915)
Lady Caroline Emily Nevill (1829–1887), an early photographer
Lady Henrietta Augusta Nevill (1830–1912), philanthropist and artist, married on 10 July 1855 Hon. Thomas Lloyd-Mostyn and had issue
Lady Isabel Mary Frances Nevill (1831–1915), married on 23 January 1854 Rev. Hon. Edward Vesey Bligh and had issue
Hon. Ralph Pelham Nevill (1832–1914), married on 12 July 1860 Louisa Marianne, daughter of Sir Charles Maclean, 9th Baronet, and had issue

Nevill died on 17 August 1868 at Birling Manor, and was buried there on 25 August. He was succeeded in the earldom by his elder son William.

Notes

Citations

References

External links

 

1792 births
1868 deaths
Alumni of Magdalene College, Cambridge
04
William
19th-century British landowners
People educated at Uckfield School
Ordained peers
People from Birling, Kent
People from Frant